Peter John Firth Baskett (1934–2008) was a Northern Irish physician, specializing in anaesthesia. He was responsible for the introduction of paramedics into the United Kingdom, created specialist ambulances for delivering on-scene pain relief to patients,  and was the first chairman of the European Resuscitation Council.

Early life 

Baskett was born in Northern Ireland on 26 July 1934. His father, Sir Ronald Gilbert Baskett, was professor and Dean of the Faculty of Agriculture at the Queen's University, Belfast and Peter was brought up on a 1000 acre research farm in Hillsborough, County Down. He attended Belfast Royal Academy and Campbell College, Belfast. He then studied medicine at Queens' College Cambridge, for his pre-clinical studies, then finished his degree at Queen's University Belfast, where he graduated with MB BCh BAO in 1958.

Career 
He did his house jobs at the Royal Victoria Hospital, Belfast which included some time in Accident & Emergency medicine. An opportunity then arose for him to spend a spell as a Lecturer in physiology. He took this on and also worked as a locum in general practice both in rural practices as well as in Belfast.

He then began to explore the possibility of specialising in anaesthesia. He had watched anaesthetists at work and had administered the mandatory anaesthetics as a medical student. He approached the late Professor John Dundee who appointed him to a post in his department. Baskett then travelled to London but, instead of doing the surgical primary fellowship as had been his original intention, he sat the anaesthetic primary fellowship going on to acquire the fellowship of the Faculty of Anaesthetists of the Royal College of Surgeons (FFARCS) in 1963.

In Belfast, he had a wide experience in many aspects of medicine, including general medicine, the early days of cardiac surgery and early intensive care. In particular, he became involved with the management of tetanus which in the rural areas was not uncommon. All of this work, however, was somewhat run-of-the- mill and he felt the need for a more academic environment. His search for a post offering a wider scope for his interests led him, in 1962, to Bristol where he was appointed registrar. In 1964, he became a senior registrar and in 1966 he was appointed consultant anaesthetist to the Bristol group of hospitals. Later that year, his friend and colleague (John Zorab) was also appointed consultant and thus began a friendship, professional and personal, that lasted until the death of John Zorab in 2006. They devised a "primary FFA course" calling on the teaching skills of many of the consultants in the Bristol area. Several years later this gave rise to a joint course with the College of Medicine in the University of Wales in Cardiff and, later still to a final FFA course.

However, while all this was going on, Baskett had turned his mind to the practical aspects of providing a resuscitation service within the hospital. At the beginning, he arranged for a resuscitation box to be located on every acute ward. This was a simple cardboard box strapped to a board - the intention being that the board could be placed under the patient's back to make external cardiac massage more effective. The boxes were located in the entrance lobby to each of the main wards. A few defibrillators were located within 'running distance' of each acute ward. 'Bleeps' had just been introduced and Baskett soon introduced the concept of a 'Resuscitation Registrar' and a hospital-wide emergency telephone number.

Baskett had, for some time, had a major interest in the use of Entonox (premixed nitrous oxide and oxygen) in pain relief.  This was a major innovation. This step marked what was probably the beginning of Baskett's most important contribution to healthcare: the provision of prehospital care by specially trained ambulance personnel. Nurses and physiotherapists had been using Entonox for some years but by equipping ambulance personnel to use it, a potent form of pain relief would be available to those who were always the first on scene. Baskett approached the Chief Ambulance Officer for the Gloucestershire Ambulance Brigade, Alan Withnell.

The ambulance personnel welcomed with open arms the idea that they might be able to provide rather more than the first aid to the patients who came under their care. Baskett approached the British Oxygen Company (BOC), who were supportive and agreed to make Entonox apparatus available for training. A regular programme of training sessions began at Frenchay hospital and after a reasonable number of individuals had been trained, a pilot study was run by the Gloucestershire Ambulance Service in which ambulances were crewed by a driver and one of the new, highly trained ambulance men. The results of this trial were published in 1970. The training sessions for ambulance personnel were very time consuming and another solution had to be found. At that time many educationalists were exploring the potential for using audio-tape combined with slides as a learning medium. With funding from BOC, a tape/slide programme was made by Baskett, John Zorab and Alan Withnell. This was a great help as several copies of the "pack" were made and they could be shown in any ambulance station in the country. So the number of trained personnel began to increase and it was not long before other ambulance services joined in. Some years later, the programme received government backing and was commended to all ambulances services in the United Kingdom (UK). Baskett's idea brought on-scene pain relief to thousands of patients every year.

He soon reasoned that if ambulance crews could be trained to provide Entonox for pain relief, there must be much more that they could learn and do. Thus, having been established in the United States by Leonard Cobb and others, the concept of the paramedic began to flourish in the UK. In order to facilitate training in Bristol, the Gloucestershire ambulance service agreed to base a specifically-equipped ambulance at Frenchay hospital. Baskett visited the manufacturers in Manchester and, together they designed a modified ambulance body with facilities for oxygen administration, ECG recording and Entonox. This first vehicle became known as the Mobile Resuscitation Unit (MRU) and was based in a small, specifically-built garage adjacent to the emergency department at Frenchay Hospital. His idea was that, when not actually out on a call, the ambulance personnel having higher training could work in the emergency department. Furthermore, if an emergency call of sufficient seriousness came in, an emergency physician or an anaesthetist could accompany the crew and provide on-scene spot training.

Frank Pantridge had established a doctor-manned prehospital coronary care service in 1967 and Douglas Chamberlain equipped ambulances in Brighton with defibrillators and trained ambulance personnel to use them. Baskett travelled extensively learning about other pre-hospital care schemes in other countries such as Germany and Denmark. Meanwhile, general practitioners (primary care doctors) with strong leadership from Kenneth Easton, were founding GP-based-schemes which, in due course, led to the foundation of the British Association for Immediate Care Schemes (BASICS). Baskett was a founder member of this organisation and was later Chairman. He was also a founder member of the Community Resuscitation Advisory Committee (CRAC). The constitution of this committee was amended in May 1984 giving rise to the Resuscitation Council (UK) - the first Resuscitation Council in Europe. Five years later, Peter was one of the Founding Members of the European Resuscitation Council (ERC) and, in August 1989, at the first Executive Committee meeting of the ERC, he was elected chairman.

As a member of the International Liaison Committee on Resuscitation (ILCOR) from 1995 to 2000, Baskett developed the international guidelines on airway management during resuscitation, and healthcare professionals across the world respected his expertise on this subject. In 1994, he published one of the first studies on the use of the laryngeal mask airway for in-hospital resuscitation. In 2005, in recognition of Baskett's contributions to resuscitation the American Heart Association awarded him as a 'Resuscitation Giant'.

Other roles 

President of the Association of Anaesthetists of Great Britain and Ireland (1990 - 1992), BASICS (1981 - 85), the United Services section of the Royal Society of Medicine (1997–99), the World Association for Emergency and Disaster Medicine (1989–93), the ERC (1989–94), the International Trauma Anaesthsia and Critical Care Society (1995–98), the Triservice Society of Anaesthetists of the South Western Region (1997–98).

Baskett had a long-standing interest in motor sport. In the 1950s he raced minis and was appointed as Chief Medical Officer to Castle Combe circuit in 1968, a position he held until 1995. Following his death in 2008, the Medical Centre at Castle Combe Race Circuit was re-named 'The Peter Baskett Medical Centre'.

In 1983, Baskett joined the Medical Section of the Territorial Army (RAMC). In 1987 he was promoted to the rank of Lt. Colonel and in 1992 was made Colonel and Commanding Officer of 219 Wessex Field Hospital.

Baskett was Editor-in-Chief of the journal Resuscitation from 1997 - 2008.

Publications 

Books:

 Use of Droperidol and Fentanyl for Anaesthesia for Ultra Sonic Destruction of the Labyrinth (Chapter) Holderness, M E & Baskett PJF. In Neuroleptanalgesia and Other Practice. Edited Shepard N.W. Published by Pergamon Press 1964.
 Analgesia for Burns Dressings in Children (Chapter) Baskett PJF. In Neue Klinische Aspekte der Neuroleptanalgesie. Edited Henschel W.F. Published by Heinemanns 1977.
 Medical Aspects of Emergency Care (Chapter) Baskett PJF, Zorab J S M. In Rescue Emergency Care. Edited Easton K.C. Published by Heinemanns 1977.
 Immediate Care, Baskett PJF, Zorab J S M. Published W B Sauders Co. Ltd 1977.
 Immediate Prehospital Care, Baskett PJF (Editor and Contributor). Published John Wiley & Son Ltd 1981.
 Involvement of The British Association for Immediate Care in Mobile Coronary Care (Chapter) Baskett PJF. In The Management of the Acute Coronary Attack. Edited Geddes J C. Published Academic Press 1986.
 Medicine for Disasters, Baskett PJF, Weller RM. Published John Wright (now Butterworths) 1988.
 Cardiopulmonary Resuscitation in Anaesthesia, Baskett PJF. Edited Smith & Nimmo W.S. Published Blackwells 1989.
 Cardiopulmonary Resuscitation, Baskett PJF (Editor and Contributor). Published Elsevier 1989.
 Resuscitation Handbook , Baskett PJF. Published Gower Medical 1989. Received 'Society of Authors' Award'.
 Resuscitation Handbook , Baskett PJF. 2nd edn. Published Mosby 1993.
 Trauma Care, A Tale of Woe (Chapter) Baskett PJF. In Saving Lives. Edited Green DG. Published I E A Health & Welfare Unit 1991.
 Textbook of Trauma Anaesthesia & Critical Care. Edited Grande C M. Section Editor Baskett PJF. Published Mosby 1993.
 Trauma Anaesthesia Practice Throughout the World - England (Chapter) Baskett PJF, Sutcliffe AJ and Field Stabilisation (Chapter) Baskett PJF and Anaesthesia & Analgesia in the Field (Chapter) Baskett PJF. In Textbook of Trauma Anaesthesia & Critical Care. Edited Grande C M. Published Mosby 1993.
 Difficult and Impossible Intubation (Chapter) Baskett PJF. Edited Fisher M McD. Clinical Anaesthesiology Series. Published Bailliere 1993.
 Practical Procedures - a Manual for Anaesthesia and Critical Care, Baskett PJF, Nolan J N, Dow AAC and Maull K. Published Mosby 1994.
 The response to major incidents and disasters (Chapter) Baskett PJF. In Textbook of Intensive Care. Edited Goldhall D, Withington S. Published Chapman & Hall.
 Pain Control and Anaesthesia in the A&E Department (Chapter) Baskett PJF, Nolan JP and Management of the Airway in the A&E Department (Chapter) Baskett PJF, Nolan JP, Parr MJ. In The Cambridge Textbook of Emergency Medicine. Edited Skinner D, Peyton R, Robertson C, Swain A and Worlock P. Published Cambridge University Press 1997.
 Simple Management of the Airway and Ventilation (Chapter)  Baskett PJF, Nolan JP, Parr MJ and Advanced Management of the Airway and Ventilation (Chapter) Baskett PJF. In Emergency Care - A Text for Paramedics. Edited Greaves I, Hodgetts T, Porter K. Published W B Saunders 1997.
 Basic Airway Management (Chapter) Baskett PJF, Field JM. In The Oxford Textbook of Critical Care. Edited Webb A, Shapiro MJ, Singer M, Suter P. In Press 1998.

Journals:
 'Ethics of Resuscitation', Baskett PJF. In The ABC of Resuscitation. Edited Evans T.R. Published British Medical Journal 1992, 1995, 1998.
 'The Trauma Anaesthesia / Critical Care Specialist in the Field', Baskett PJF. In Trauma Anesthesia and Critical Care - Critical Care - Critical Care Clinics Series. Critical Care Clinics 6(1) 1990.
 'Management of Hypovolaemic Shock', Baskett PJF. In The ABC of Major Trauma. Edited Skinner D, Driscoll P, Earlan R. Published British Medical Journal 1990.
 'Organisation and Academic Perspectives in Disaster Medicine', Baskett PJF (with others). In Disaster Management - Critical Care - Critical Care Clinics. Critical Care Clinics 1991.
 'Trauma Anaesthesia for Disasters - Anything, Anytime, Anywhere', Baskett PJF (co-author). In Disaster Management - Critical Care - Critical Care Clinics. Critical Care Clinics 1991.
 'Is an Intensive Care Unit Really Necessary?', Baskett PJF. Published in the British Medico-Chirurgical Journal 1965.
 'Use of Entonox in the Ambulance Service', Baskett PJF, Witherall A. Published British Medical Journal 1970.
 'Pain Relief in Hospital - the more widespread use of Nitrous Oxide', Baskett PJF, Bennett JA, Sulmon P. Published Anaesthesia 1971.
 'The Use of Entonox in the Ambulance Service', Baskett PJF. Published Proceedings of the Royal Society of Medicine 1972.
 'The Role of Entonox in Pain Relief', Baskett PJF. Published British Hospital Export Council Year Book 1973.
 'The Role of Entonox in Pain Relief', Baskett PJF. Published British Operating Theatres 1997.
 'The Use of Entonox by Nursing Staff and Physiotherapists', Baskett PJF. Published Nursing Mirror and Midwives Journal 1972.
 'The painful Emergency', Baskett PJF. Published Interface 1973.
 'Experience with a Hospital Resuscitation Service', Baskett PJF, Eltringham RJ. Published Resuscitation 1973.
 'An Assessment of the Oxygen Tensions Obtained with Premixed 50% Nitrous Oxide and Oxygen Mixture used for Pain Relief' Baskett PJF, Bennett JA, Eltringham RJ. Published Anaesthesia 1973.
 Invitation Editorial for the Lancet on Immediate Care, Baskett PJF. Published Lancet 1974.
 'Priorities in Immediate Care', Baskett PJF. Published Anaesthesia 1975.
 'The Resuscitation Teaching Room in a District General Hospital - Concept and Practice', Baskett PJF, Lawler P et al. Published British Medical Journal 1976.
 'Urban Mobile Resuscitation - Training and Service', Baskett PJF, Diamond A W, Cochrane D F. Published British Journal of Anaesthesia 1976.
 'Immediate Care - or should we wait?', Baskett PJF. Published World Medicine 1977.

References 

Anaesthetists from Northern Ireland
1934 births
2008 deaths
Presidents of the Association of Anaesthetists